Three Comrades is a 1936 novel by the German author Erich Maria Remarque. It is written in first person by the main character Robert Lohkamp, whose somewhat disillusioned outlook on life is due to his horrifying experiences in the trenches of the First World War's French-German front. He shares these experiences with Otto Köster and Gottfried Lenz, his two comrades with whom he runs an auto-repair shop in what may be late-1920s Berlin. Remarque wrote the novel in exile and it was first published in the Dutch translation; the English translation followed soon, being serialised in Good Housekeeping from January to March 1937, and in the book form later in the year. The first German language edition was published in 1938 by exile publisher Querido in Amsterdam, but the novel was published in Germany only in 1951.

Plot
The city, which never is referred to by name (however, it is likely Berlin), is crowded by a growing number of jobless and marked by increasing violence between left and right. The novel starts in the seedy milieu of bars where prostitutes mingle with the hopeless flotsam that the war left behind. While Robert and his friends manage to make a living dealing cars and driving an old taxi, economic survival in the city is getting harder by the day. It is in this setting that Robert meets Patrice Hollmann, a mysterious, beautiful, young woman with an upper-middle-class background. Their love affair intensifies as he introduces her to his life of bars and races and Robert's nihilistic attitude slowly begins to change as he realizes how much he needs Pat.

The story takes an abrupt turn as Pat suffers a near-fatal lung hemorrhage during a summer holiday at the sea. Upon their return, Robert and Pat move in with each other, but she is scheduled to leave for a Swiss mountain sanatorium come winter. It is this temporal limitation of their happiness which makes their remaining time together so precious.

After Pat has left for Switzerland, the political situation in the city becomes heated, and Lenz, one of the comrades, is killed by a militant, not mentioned in the book by the actual name but supposed to be a Nazi. On top of this, Otto and Robert face bankruptcy and have to sell their workshop. In the midst of this misfortune, a telegram arrives informing them of Pat's worsening state of health. The two remaining comrades don't hesitate and drive the thousand kilometers to the sanatorium in the Alps to see her.

Reunited, Robert and an increasingly moribund Pat celebrate their remaining weeks before her inevitable death amid the snow-covered summits of Switzerland. It is in the last part of the book that this love story finds closure and leaves the main character, a nihilist who has found love, forever changed.

Film, TV, and theatrical adaptations
The novel was adapted in America as Three Comrades, a 1938 film starring Franchot Tone, Robert Taylor, Robert Young and Margaret Sullavan. Hayao Miyazaki's last film, The Wind Rises, also follows a strikingly similar plot, although set in Japan in the same time period.

Flowers from the Victors (1999), directed by Aleksander Surin, also was based on the novel but set in Russia in the 1990s.

References

1936 German novels
Novels by Erich Maria Remarque
Novels set in Germany
Hutchinson (publisher) books
Little, Brown and Company books
German novels adapted into films